Kothapeta Mandal is one of the 22 mandals in Konaseema district of Andhra Pradesh. As per census 2011, there are 10 villages in this Mandal.

Demographics 
Kothapeta Mandal has total population of 77,859 as per the Census 2011 out of which 39,053 are males while 38,806 are females. The average Sex Ratio of Kothapeta Mandal is 994. The total literacy rate of Kothapeta Mandal is 79%.

Towns and villages

Villages 
1. Avidi
2. Billa Kurru
3. Ganti
4. Khandrika
5. Kothapeta
6. Mandapalle
7. Modekurru
8. Palivela
9. Vadapalem
10. Vanapalle

See also 
List of mandals in Andhra Pradesh

References 

Mandals in Konaseema district
Mandals in Andhra Pradesh